Ilir Seitaj (born 1957) is an Albanian chess International Master. Seitaj has won the Albanian Chess Championship tournament four times (1983, 1991, 1999, and 2009).

References

External links

1957 births
Living people
Albanian chess players
Chess International Masters